Irwin Thornton Catharine (October 22, 1883 – March 3, 1944) was the chief architect of Philadelphia public schools from 1920 until his retirement in 1937.  Buildings built during Catharine's tenure ranged from Gothic Revival, as in the case of Simon Gratz High School, to Streamline Moderne, as in his last project, Joseph H. Brown Elementary School.  He died in Philadelphia in 1944.

Catharine succeeded Henry deCoursey Richards as the main school designer in Philadelphia. From 1918 to 1937, his work added 104 new buildings (replacing 37 existing ones), added wings to 26 other schools, and otherwise improved at least 50 other schools.

A number of his works are listed on the U.S. National Register of Historic Places.

Works (all in Philadelphia) include:
James Alcorn School, (1931), 1500 S. 32nd St., NRHP-listed
Ethan Allen School, 3001 Robbins Ave., NRHP-listed
Charles Y. Audenried Junior High School, 1601 S. 33rd St., NRHP-listed
Bartlett School, 1100 Catharine St., NRHP-listed
Clara Barton School, 300 E. Wyoming Ave., NRHP-listed
John Bartram High School, 67th and Elmwood Sts., NRHP-listed
Dimner Beeber Junior High School, 5901 Malvern Ave., NRHP-listed
Belmont School, 4030-4060 Brown St., NRHP-listed
Rudolph Blankenburg School, 4600 Girard Ave., NRHP-listed
Board of Education Building, 21st St. and Benjamin Franklin Pkwy., NRHP-listed
Edward Bok Vocational School, 1909 S. Ninth St., NRHP-listed
Daniel Boone School, Hancock and Wildey Sts., NRHP-listed
F. Amadee Bregy School, 1700 Bigler St., NRHP-listed
Joseph H. Brown School, 8118-8120 Frankford Ave., NRHP-listed
Laura H. Carnell School, 6101 Summerdale Ave., NRHP-listed
Lewis C. Cassidy School, 6523-6543 Lansdowne Ave., NRHP-listed
Joseph W. Catharine School, 6600 Chester Ave., NRHP-listed
Central High School, Olney and Ogontz Aves., Logan neighborhood of Philadelphia, NRHP-listed
Russell H. Conwell School, 1829-1951 E. Clearfield St., NRHP-listed
Jay Cooke Junior High School, 4735 Old York Rd., NRHP-listed
Thomas Creighton School, 5401 Tabor Rd., NRHP-listed
Kennedy Crossan School, 7341 Palmetto St., NRHP-listed
Lydia Darrah School, 708-732 N. 17th St., NRHP-listed
Hamilton Disston School, 6801 Cottage St., NRHP-listed
Murrell Dobbins Vocational School, 2100 Lehigh Ave., NRHP-listed
James Dobson School, 4665 Umbria St., NRHP-listed
Laurence Dunbar School, 12th above Columbia Ave., NRHP-listed
Henry R. Edmunds School, 1101-1197 Haworth St., NRHP-listed
James Elverson, Jr. School, 1300 Susquehanna Ave., NRHP-listed
Eleanor Cope Emlen School of Practice, 6501 Chew St., NRHP-listed
Federal Street School, 1130-1148 Federal St., NRHP-listed
D. Newlin Fell School, 900 Oregon Ave., NRHP-listed
Joseph C. Ferguson School, 2000-2046 7th St., NRHP-listed
Thomas K. Finletter School, 6101 N. Front St., NRHP-listed
Thomas Fitzsimons Junior High School, 2601 W. Cumberland St., NRHP-listed
Edwin Forrest School, 4300 Bleigh St., NRHP-listed
Robert Fulton School, 60-68 E. Haines St., NRHP-listed
Elizabeth Duane Gillespie Junior High School, 3901-3961 N. 18th St., NRHP-listed
Simon Gratz High School, 3901-3961 N. 18th St., NRHP-listed
Warren G. Harding Junior High School, 2000 Wakeling St., NRHP-listed
William H. Harrison School, 1012-1020 W. Thompson St., NRHP-listed
Francis Hopkinson School, 1301-1331 E. Luzerne Ave., NRHP-listed
Henry H. Houston School, 135 W. Allen's Ln., NRHP-listed
Thomas Jefferson School, 1101-1125 N. 4th St., NRHP-listed
John Story Jenks School, 8301-8317 Germantown Ave., NRHP-listed
John Paul Jones Junior High School, 2922 Memphis St., NRHP-listed
Eliza Butler Kirkbride School, 626 Dickinson St., NRHP-listed
Logan Demonstration School, 5000 N. 17th St., NRHP-listed
James R. Ludlow School, 1323-1345 N. 6th St., NRHP-listed
William Mann School, 1835-1869 N. 54th St., NRHP-listed
Martin Orthopedic School, 800 N. 22nd St., NRHP-listed
Delaplaine McDaniel School, 2100 Moore St., NRHP-listed
George Meade School, 1801 Oxford St., NRHP-listed
William M. Meredith School, 5th and Fitzwater Sts., NRHP-listed
Thomas Mifflin School, 3500 Midvale Ave., NRHP-listed
Andrew J. Morrison School, 300 Duncannon St., NRHP-listed
George W. Nebinger School, 601-627 Carpenter St., NRHP-listed
Jeremiah Nichols School, 1235 S. 16th St., NRHP-listed
Olney High School, Duncannon and Front Sts., NRHP-listed
Overbrook High School, 59th and Lancaster Ave., NRHP-listed
John M. Patterson School, 7001 Buist Ave., NRHP-listed
William S. Peirce School, 2400 Christian St., NRHP-listed
Penn Treaty Junior High School, 600 E. Thompson St., NRHP-listed
Joseph Pennell School, 1800-1856 Nedro St., NRHP-listed
Samuel W. Pennypacker School, 1800-1850 E. Washington Ln., NRHP-listed
Philadelphia High School for Girls (now Julia R. Masterman School), 17th and Spring Garden Sts., NRHP-listed
Gen. John F. Reynolds School, 2300 Jefferson St., NRHP-listed
Richmond School, 2942 Belgrade St., NRHP-listed
Theodore Roosevelt Junior High School, 430 E. Washington Ln., NRHP-listed
William Rowen School, 6801 N. 19th St., NRHP-listed
Anna Howard Shaw Junior High School, 5401 Warrington St., NRHP-listed
William Shoemaker Junior High School, 1464-1488 N. 53rd St., NRHP-listed
Franklin Smedley School, 5199 Mulberry St., NRHP-listed
Walter George Smith School, 1300 S. 19th St., NRHP-listed
Spring Garden School No. 1, 12th and Ogden Sts., NRHP-listed
Spring Garden School No. 2, Melon St. S of 12th St., NRHP-listed
Edwin M. Stanton School, 1616-1644 Christian St., NRHP-listed
Thaddeus Stevens School of Observation, 1301 Spring Garden St., NRHP-listed
James J. Sullivan School, 5300 Ditman St., NRHP-listed
Mayer Sulzberger Junior High School, 701-741 N. 48th St., NRHP-listed
George C. Thomas Junior High School, 2746 S. 9th St., NRHP-listed
William J. Tilden Junior High School, 66th St. and Elmwood Ave., NRHP-listed
Edwin H. Vare Junior High School, 2102 S. 24th St., NRHP-listed
Roberts Vaux Junior High School, 230-2344 W. Master St., NRHP-listed
Gen. Louis Wagner Junior High School, 17th and Chelton Sts., NRHP-listed
George Washington School, 5th and Federal Sts., NRHP-listed
Woodrow Wilson Junior High School, Cottman Ave. and Loretta St., NRHP-listed
Mary Channing Wister School, 843-855 N. 8th St., NRHP-listed
George Wolf School, 8100 Lyons Ave., NRHP-listed

If Catharine has notable works outside of Philadelphia, none are listed on the National Register.

References

1883 births
1944 deaths
20th-century American architects
Streamline Moderne architects
Architects from Philadelphia